The Putu mine is a large iron mine located in south-east Liberia in Grand Gedeh County. Putu represents one of the largest iron ore reserves in Liberia and in the world having estimated reserves of 2.37 billion tonnes of ore grading 34.1% iron metal.

References 

Iron mines in Liberia
Grand Gedeh County